Khurai is one of the 230 Vidhan Sabha (Legislative Assembly) constituencies of Madhya Pradesh state in central India. This constituency came into existence in 1951, as one of the 184 Vidhan Sabha constituencies of Madhya Pradesh state. It was reserved for the candidates belonging to the Scheduled castes till 2008.

Overview
Khurai (constituency number 36) is one of the 8 Vidhan Sabha constituencies located in Sagar district. This constituency presently covers the Khurai municipality and part of Khurai tehsil of the district.

Khurai is part of Sagar Lok Sabha constituency along with seven other Vidhan Sabha segments, namely, Bina, Surkhi, Naryoli and Sagar in this district and Kurwai, Sironj and Shamshabad in Vidisha district.

Members of Legislative Assembly
As a double member constituency:
 1951: Gaya Prasad Mathura Prasad, Indian National Congress / Ramlal Balchand, Indian National Congress
 1957: Bhadai Halke, Indian National Congress / Rishabh Kumar Mohanlal, Indian National Congress
As a single member constituency:
 1962: Nand Lal Parmanand, Indian National Congress
 1967: K. L. Choudhari, Bharatiya Jana Sangh
 1972: Liladhar, Indian National Congress (I)
 1977: Ram Prasad, Janata Party
 1980: Harishankar Mangal Prasad Ahirwar, Indian National Congress (I)
 1985: Malti Arvind Kumar, Indian National Congress (I)
 1990: Dharmu Rai, Bharatiya Janata Party
 1993: Dharmu Rai, Bharatiya Janata Party
 1998: Dharmu Rai, Bharatiya Janata Party
 2003: Dharmu Rai, Bharatiya Janata Party
 2008: Arunodaya Choubey, Indian National Congress (I)
 2013: Bhupendra Singh, Bharatiya Janata Party

See also
 Khurai

References

Sagar district
Assembly constituencies of Madhya Pradesh